Box and Cox may refer to:

Box and Cox (farce), a comic play by John Maddison Morton first produced in 1847
Box and Cox Publications, a London music publisher
George Box and Sir David Cox, who devised the Box–Cox transformation to normalise data into a Box–Cox distribution

See also
 Cox and Box, a one-act comic opera based on the 1847 play Box and Cox.